Westwood International School is an English medium international school in Gaborone, Botswana. It was founded in 1988 with sponsorship from the American and British governments and in collaboration with the Botswana Ministry of Education. US, British and South African teaching materials are employed.

Head of School, Robert Jones, is British, Secondary Principal, Heidi Cavanagh is Canadian, Primary Principal, Esme De Jager is South African. These three are the Senior Leadership Team (SLT).

History
Westwood International School was founded in May 1988 under the sponsorship of the British and American governments and local companies in collaboration with the Botswana Ministry of Education.

Educational program
The school's educational program extends from kindergarten through grade 13. The school year, beginning in January and ending in December, comprises 3 trimesters: mid-January to mid-April, mid-May to early August, and mid-September to early December.

Fees and finances
During the 2015-2016 school year over 97% of the school's income derives from tuition fees.
Annual tuition rates, in US Dollars, are as follows:

(Accurate as of March 13, 2017)
For new students, there is a one-time, non-refundable fee of BWP 20,000, (Approx USD 2,000). There is also a testing fee.

See also 
 Maru-a-Pula School
 St. Joseph's College, Kgale

References

External links
 Official website
 US State Department report
Westwood International School, Botswana - International Schools and English Schools in Africa

Educational institutions established in 1988
Secondary schools in Gaborone
International schools in Gaborone
1988 establishments in Botswana